Amma is a 1968 Indian Kannada-language film, directed and produced by B. R. Panthulu. The film stars Rajkumar, Bharathi, B. R. Panthulu and M. V. Rajamma. The film has musical score by T. G. Lingappa. In a small drama sequence, he appeared as Babruvahana. In another sequence, the tragic climax of William Shakespeare's Romeo and Juliet was adapted on - screen in English with Rajkumar playing the role of Romeo and Bharathi as Juliet.

Cast

Soundtrack
The music was composed by T. G. Lingappa.

References

External links
 
 

1960s Kannada-language films
Films scored by T. G. Lingappa
Films directed by B. R. Panthulu